"American Heartbeat" is a song by American rock band Survivor. It is the second most successful single from Eye of the Tiger, peaking at number 17 on the US charts. It appears as the eighth track on the album.

Release 
The song debuted at number 79 on September 25, 1982, and stayed there for sixteen weeks. It peaked at number 17 in the week of November 20, 1982, becoming Survivor's third top 40 hit. There was also a limited heart-shaped 7" release.

Track listing
 "American Heartbeat" – 3:50
 "Silver Girl" – 4:53

Chart performance

References 

1982 songs
1982 singles
Survivor (band) songs
Songs written by Frankie Sullivan
Songs written by Jim Peterik
Scotti Brothers Records singles